Flights of Fancy: Trio Fascination: Edition Two is an album by the American jazz saxophonist Joe Lovano  recorded in 2000 and released on the Blue Note label. The album is a sequel to Lovano's Trio Fascination: Edition One (1998) but, unlike the earlier album which featured a conventional sax-bass-drums lineup, Edition Two finds Lovano shifting between four different and often eclectic trio configurations.

Reception
The AllMusic review by David R. Adler awarded the album 4 stars, stating: "Taking the trio concept beyond the traditional confines of horn, bass, and drums, Lovano takes a left turn and colors this album with continually changing instrumentation... Fans looking for more of the hard-driving, free-spirited swing of the first Trio Fascination record will find it here in smaller doses. And those who got their first taste of Lovano with 2000's neo-bop nonet record 52nd Street Themes ought to be prepared for something very different."

Track listing
All compositions by Joe Lovano except as indicated
 "Flights of Fancy" - 6:22 
 "On April (I'll Remember April)" (Gene de Paul, Patricia Johnston, Don Raye) - 3:31 
 "Amsterdam" - 4:36 
 "Blue Mist" - 4:26 
 "Off and Runnin'" - 4:01 
 "Infant Eyes" (Wayne Shorter) - 6:26 
 "206" - 6:35 
 "Bougainvillea" (Judi Silvano) - 8:00 
 "Windom Street" - 4:52 
 "Hot Shot" - 4:42 
 "Aisha" (McCoy Tyner) - 3:56 
 "Amber" - 3:09 
 "On Giant Steps" (John Coltrane) - 5:46 
 "Flights of Fancy (Reprise)" - 1:25

Personnel
Joe Lovano – tenor saxophone, alto saxophone, soprano saxophone, alto clarinet, drums, percussion, gong

in trios with:
 Idris Muhammad (drums) and Cameron Brown (bass) 
 Billy Drewes (soprano saxophone, alto flute) and Joey Baron (drums)
 Toots Thielemans (harmonica) and Kenny Werner (piano)
 Dave Douglas (trumpet) and Mark Dresser (bass)

References

External links
 

Blue Note Records albums
Joe Lovano albums
2000 albums